Merete Armand (8 June 1955 – 22 January 2017) was a Norwegian actress.

Life 
She was born in Bergen, a daughter of actor Eilif Armand, and sister of actors Gisken Armand and Frøydis Armand. She was educated at the Norwegian National Academy of Theatre. She was assigned with the theatres Sogn og Fjordane Teater, Telemark Teater, Trøndelag Teater, Riksteatret and Den Nationale Scene. She was awarded Pernillestatuetten in 1997.

References

1955 births
2017 deaths
Actors from Bergen
Oslo National Academy of the Arts alumni
20th-century Norwegian actresses
21st-century Norwegian actresses
Norwegian stage actresses